Majed Chergui (born 1956 in Casablanca) is a Swiss and French physicist specialized in ultrafast dynamics of light-induced processes. He is a professor at EPFL (École Polytechnique Fédérale de Lausanne), head of the Laboratory of Ultrafast Spectroscopy at EPFL's School of Basic Sciences, and founding director of the Lausanne Centre for Ultrafast Science (LACUS).

Career 
Chergui was born in Casablanca (Morocco), and grew up in Algeria and Lebanon. He studied physics and mathematics at the Chelsea College at University of London and received his bachelor's degree in 1977. In 1978, he received a master's degree in atomic and molecular physics from Paris-Sud University, Orsay. He then joined Jacques Bauche at the same university as a PhD student and graduated in 1981. In 1986, he received a Doctorat d'État (habilitation) under supervision of Venkataraman Chandrasekharan at the Université Sorbonne Paris Nord. In 1987, he joined the group of Nikolaus Schwentner as a  Alexander von Humboldt postdoctoral fellow at the Institute for Experimental Physics of the Free University of Berlin.  Three years later he became a senior research assistant at the same institute. In 1993 he was appointed as full professor of experimental condensed matter physics at the University of Lausanne, where he stayed until 2003.

In 2003, he was appointed as full professor of physics and chemistry at EPFL and  head of the Laboratory of Ultrafast Spectroscopy at EPFL's School of Basic Sciences.

In 1996, he was guest professor at National University of Quilmes in Buenos Aires, Argentina, and from 1999 to 2000 research associate at the American University of Beirut. He was twice  Alexander von Humboldt Guest Professor at the Max-Born-Institut and at the Helmholtz-Zentrum Berlin (2009-2010), and at the Fritz-Haber-Institut (2016-2017) in Berlin.

Research 
Chergui's research interest are the description of the ultrafast dynamics of light-induced processes in molecules, solids and proteins, and in metallic and semiconductor nanostructured materials.  He uses ultrafast spectroscopy to achieve real time visualizations of  light-induced nuclear, spin and electronic dynamics . The latter include structural changes in diverse systems (molecules, proteins, solids), the influence of local electric fields on the spectral and dynamical features of molecular centers, and the charge carriers dynamics in semiconductor, metallic nanostructures and solids.  To these aims, he develops and improves new tools in ultrafast (picosecond and femtosecond) transient absorption spectroscopy; ultrafast fluorescence up-conversion spectroscopy; photon-echo spectroscopy; and   2-dimensional  and circular dichroism spectroscopy. He pioneered the development of ultrafast X-ray spectroscopy using pulses from a synchrotron or from a X-ray Free electron Laser (XFEL).

Distinctions 
Chergui is the recipient of the 2021 Ahmed Zewail Award in Ultrafast Science and Technology from the American Chemical Society, the 2019 Liversidge Award of the Royal Society of Chemistry, the 2018 Khwarizmi International Award, the Edward Stern Prize for Lifetime Achievements 2015,  the 2015 Earle L. Plyler Award of the American Physical Society, the 2010 Humboldt Research Award, the 2009 Kuwait Prize for Physics, the 2007 Rammal Medal by the Euroscience Foundation, and the 2002 Miller Award. He is also recipient of the 1986 Bronze Medal of the CNRS (France).

He is a fellow of the European Academy of Sciences (EurASc), a member of the Academy of Arab Scientists (2020), an Elettra Distinguished Scientist (2020) (Elettra Sincrotrone Trieste),  and Foreign Correspondent of the Royal Spanish Academy of Sciences. He is also a fellow of The Optical Society of America, and fellow of the American Physical Society (APS),  the American Crystallographic Association (ACA), the Royal Society of Chemistry (RSC), the European Physical Society (EPS).

He is the founder of the journal Structural Dynamics, and was its Editor in Chief between 2014 and 2020. Prior to that, he was editor in chief of the journal Chemical Physics between 2009 and 2014.

Selected works

References

External links 
 
 Website of the Laboratory of Ultrafast Spectroscopy

Living people
Free University of Berlin alumni
1956 births
Alumni of the University of London
Academic staff of the École Polytechnique Fédérale de Lausanne
Swiss physicists
French physicists
Fellows of the American Physical Society